Jean-François Gariépy (born 1984) is a French Canadian white nationalist, former neuroscience researcher, and alt-right political commentator. Gariépy hosted the YouTube channel The Public Space before launching his current channel JFG Tonight where he calls for the creation of a white ethnostate, promotes antisemitic messages, and advocates for the genetic superiority of white people.  The Anti-Defamation League lists The Public Space among "White Supremacist Channels". Gariépy has been described as a "standard bearer of the alt-right."

Personal life 
Gariépy was raised in Saint-Sophie, Québec and has been married three times. Gariépy and his third wife separated in July 2015. In December 2015, his wife gave birth to his first son. In the ensuing custody case, his wife accused Gariépy of "emotional abuse" and of "threatening to abduct their child to his native Canada." Gariépy's wife was given custody, to which Gariépy appealed. The appellate court judge ordered Gariépy to undergo a psychological evaluation which resulted in Gariépy being evaluated as "very bright, intellectually", while also showing a "lack of insight and impulse control".

During the custody case, Gariépy started a relationship with a 19-year-old mestizo autistic woman from Texas, and eventually convinced her to drive to North Carolina to be with him and attempted to get her pregnant. As the parents objected to her daughter's relationship with Gariépy, a case was filed in which the woman was revealed to have "the social and mental maturity of a 10- or 11-year-old child", according to a psychologist. Gariépy claimed she was pregnant with his child, but this was proven false. Guardianship was consequently transferred to the parents who severed the relationship. In an interview, Gariépy told The Daily Beast that the current family court system is designed to "harass men, to harass white, heterosexual males. Right now I'm currently being treated as a criminal by courts that don't have the power to put me in jail, but they have the power to ruin my life."

Scientist 
Gariépy studied biology at the Université de Montreal. In 2008, the Society for Neuroscience awarded Gariépy the Next Generation Award. In 2012, he finished a doctoral thesis in French about the neural networks involved in the respiratory rhythm in lampreys. From September 2011 until September 2015, Gariépy studied social interactions in monkeys at the Institute for Brain Sciences at Duke University. Over his scientific career, Gariépy published 21 research items that were cited 529 times.

Gariépy was not asked to return to his postdoctoral position. At this time, Gariépy was in a relationship with one of his undergraduate lab assistants. Gariépy told The Daily Beast he left Duke University for Canada because "he'd grown disillusioned with the scientific community." In a Facebook post, Gariépy said he was leaving academia because it was "defective" and was interfering with "a true search for knowledge". He said he would continue to search for "a better way" to satisfy his scientific curiosity. As of 2018, he had moved back to Canada following changes to his legal immigration status related to his divorce from his third wife.

In 2014, Gariépy received $25,000 from Jeffrey Epstein to start the nonprofit organization NEURO.tv which was dedicated to education on science and philosophy via YouTube. Asked whether he felt any regrets for having taken money from a sex offender, Gariépy said: "I'd cash a check sent straight from the devil if it could allow me to advance science or science education [...] I did know about the earlier conviction of Epstein when I accepted the money. I didn't know of the most recent allegations though, which are worse than I thought. In any case, I do not regret taking the money. Evil people are not just evil." Later that year Gariépy requested additional funding from Epstein to finance his book, The Revolutionary Phenotype. Epstein did not respond. The book, which was self-published in 2018, argues that artificial intelligence, genetic engineering, and other advances might lead to the destruction of humanity.

Political commentator 
Gariépy made his first public appearance on episode 76 of the podcast Drunken Peasants in 2015. In 2017, Gariépy joined the YouTube channel Warski Live as co-host. At Warski Live, Gariépy introduced topics like scientific racism by discussing ethnic differences with guests like Richard B. Spencer, Millennial Woes, Andrew Anglin and Sargon of Akkad. At Warski Live, Gariépy gained notoriety among the alt-right as a moderator of the so-called "YouTube Bloodsports" where two or more mainly right-wing guests engage in often highly abusive discussions on politics.

After a falling out with his co-host, Andy Warski, in April 2018, Gariépy founded his own YouTube channel "The Public Space". The channel has, among many others, featured white nationalists and alt-right figures like Richard B. Spencer, David Duke, Mike Peinovich, Nick Fuentes and Greg Johnson.

Selected works

References

External links 
 Jean-Francois Gariépy at ResearchGate
 Jean-François Gariépy at Duke University

1984 births
Living people
Alt-right writers
Antisemitism in Canada
Canadian atheists
Canadian neuroscientists
Canadian white supremacists
Canadian YouTubers
Far-right politics in Canada
Male critics of feminism
Race and intelligence controversy
Proponents of scientific racism
YouTube controversies